Atmatyag ( Sacrifice) (2012) is a Bengali drama film directed by Kumar Monojit and produced by A. K. Movie Makers.

Cast 
 Manoj Mitra
 Chumki Chowdhury
 Dulal Lahiri
 Satinath Mukhopadhyay
 Debika Mukhopadhyay

See also 
 Mon Bole Priya Priya, Bengali-language film released in 2011

External links

References 

2012 films
Bengali-language Indian films
2010s Bengali-language films
Indian drama films